Ufuk Esin (11 October 1933 – 19 January 2008) was a Turkish archaeologist known for pioneering archaeological science in Turkey and for her excavations at Aşıklı Höyük. She was a professor at Istanbul University from 1966 until her retirement in 2000 and was instrumental in founding the Turkish Academy of Sciences.

Education and career 
Esin was born in İzmir on 11 October 1933, but spent most of her life in Istanbul. She attended the Boğaziçi Lisesinde and St. George's Austrian High School. She enrolled at Istanbul University in 1952, initially taking the examinations to study literature, but was inspired to transfer to the newly-founded Department of Prehistory after hearing lectures by Kurt Bittel. One of only two students to enrol that year, she became the university's first graduate in prehistory in 1956. She then joined the department as Bittel's assistant whilst beginning her doctoral studies.

Bittel sent Esin to the University of Stuttgart to study archaeometallurgy with S. Junghans. There she developed an expertise in the spectral analysis of ancient metals, as well as a general passion for archaeological science that would continue throughout her career. She went on to complete a thesis on prehistoric copper and bronze mining in Anatolia and was awarded a doctorate in 1960. She was appointed an associate professor at Istanbul in 1966, and later rose to become a full professor (1976); head of the department of prehistory (1984–2000); and head of the department of archaeology and art history (1998–2000).

Awards and honours 
 Fulbright Scholarship, 1961
 Alexander von Humboldt Scholarship, 1973

References 

1933 births
2008 deaths
Archaeologists from Istanbul
Turkish women archaeologists
Prehistorians
Archaeometallurgists
St. George's Austrian High School alumni
Istanbul University alumni
Academic staff of Istanbul University
Members of the Turkish Academy of Sciences
20th-century archaeologists